Multidrug resistance-associated protein 9 is a protein that in humans is encoded by the ABCC12 gene.

Function 

This gene is a member of the superfamily of ATP-binding cassette (ABC) transporters and the encoded protein contains two ATP-binding domains and 12 transmembrane regions. ABC proteins transport various molecules across extra- and intracellular membranes. ABC genes are divided into seven distinct subfamilies: ABC1, MDR/TAP, MRP, ALD, OABP, GCN20, and White. This gene is a member of the MRP subfamily which is involved in multi-drug resistance. This gene and another subfamily member are arranged head-to-tail on chromosome 16q12.1. Increased expression of this gene is associated with breast cancer. Loss of function is implicated in hereditary cholestasis.

References

External links
 
Adding link to ABCC12 gene details page and display in UCSC genome browser.

Further reading